James Christopher Varner (born October 12, 1984) is a retired American mixed martial artist who fought in the Ultimate Fighting Championship. He is the former WEC Lightweight Champion.

Background
Born and raised in Phoenix, Arizona, Varner attended Deer Valley High School where he competed in wrestling. At Deer Valley, Varner was a two-time Regional Champion and a State Runner Up and went on to compete at Pima Community College where he was a two-time National Qualifier and a National Runner Up, in addition to being an NJCAA All-American and a two-time Academic All-American.

Mixed martial arts career

Ultimate Fighting Championship
Varner competed twice in the UFC. His first appearance was against veteran Hermes Franca, which Varner lost via submission (armbar) in round three. His final appearance was against formerly undefeated Jason Gilliam, which he won via first round submission (rear naked choke). After this win, Varner transferred to the WEC.

World Extreme Cagefighting
Varner successfully defended his WEC Lightweight Championship against the previously undefeated Marcus Hicks on August 3, 2008.

He next retained his title on January 25, 2009, defeating Donald Cerrone via technical split decision at WEC 38. The fight was highly competitive and won the Fight of the Night award. However, the fight was stopped prematurely in the fifth round when Cerrone hit Varner's temple with an illegal knee while Varner was still on the ground. Varner was given time to recover, but he was unable to continue, noting that he had double vision and had sustained a broken hand.

Varner faced Benson Henderson to unify the WEC Lightweight Championship at WEC 46 on January 10, 2010. After outboxing and outwrestling Henderson in the first two rounds, Henderson came back and caught Varner in a standing guillotine choke ending the fight at 2:41 of the third round.

Varner was expected to face Kamal Shalorus on April 24, 2010 at WEC 48, but the bout was called off due to an injury sustained by Shalorus. Varner/Shalorus was then rescheduled for June 20, 2010 at WEC 49. The match ended in a split draw.
 
Varner faced Donald Cerrone in a highly anticipated rematch on September 30, 2010 at WEC 51. He lost the fight via unanimous decision.

Varner faced Shane Roller on December 16, 2010 at WEC 53.  He lost via submission in the first round and was subsequently released from the promotion.

Post Zuffa
In his first post-Zuffa fight, Varner fought Tyler Combs for XFO and won via submission in the first round. He was also in negotiations for a possible fight against DREAM Lightweight Champion Shinya Aoki at the end of May 2011, but the bout did not materialize.

Varner headlined Titan Fighting Championships 20 against Dakota Cochrane on September 23, 2011, losing by unanimous decision.

Varner has signed a three-fight contract with XFC. He debuted on the XFC 14 show, defeating Nate Jolly via KO in round one. He returned on the XFC 16 High Stakes card which took place on February 10, 2012 from the Knoxville Civic Auditorium-Coliseum in Knoxville, Tennessee. He defeated Drew Fickett via TKO due to strikes just 40 seconds into round one.

Return to the UFC
It was announced that Varner would replace Evan Dunham, who suffered an injury, to fight undefeated prospect Edson Barboza on May 26, 2012 at UFC 146. Varner defeated Barboza by TKO due to punches in the first round.

Varner replaced an injured Terry Etim against Joe Lauzon on August 4, 2012 at UFC on Fox: Shogun vs. Vera. Varner broke his hand in the second round and lost at 2:44 in the third round via triangle choke. However, his performance earned him the $50,000 Fight of the Night bonus and a Fight of the Year nomination at the World MMA Awards.

Varner was scheduled to face Melvin Guillard on December 15, 2012 at the Ultimate Fighter 16 Finale. However, Varner fell ill the day of the event and the bout was scrapped from the card. Varner/Guillard was rescheduled for December 29, 2012 at UFC 155. Varner won the fight via split decision (30-27, 27-30, 30-27). Joe Rogan said post fight that "whoever scored it 30 to 27 for Guillard should never be allowed to judge a fight again."

Varner faced Gleison Tibau on August 31, 2013 at UFC 164. He lost the fight via split decision.

Varner was expected to face Pat Healy on December 14, 2013 at UFC on Fox 9.  However, Varner pulled out of the bout due to injury and was replaced by Bobby Green

Varner faced Abel Trujillo on February 1, 2014 at UFC 169, replacing Bobby Green. He lost the back-and-forth fight via knockout in the second round.  Despite the loss, Varner was given a Fight of the Night bonus award for the bout. The loss was also Varner's first knockout loss in his career.

Varner faced James Krause on May 24, 2014 at UFC 173.  Varner lost the fight via TKO due to injury as he broke his ankle in the first round and was unable to continue into the second round.

Varner next fought Drew Dober on December 13, 2014 at UFC on Fox 13. He lost the fight via a rear-naked choke. Varner landed on his head while attempting a takedown, temporarily rocking him and allowing Dober to take Varner's back to get the choke. In his post-fight interview inside the octagon, Varner announced his retirement from mixed martial arts competition.

Personal life
He is an alumnus of Deer Valley High School in Glendale, Arizona, where he also was a part of the Deer Valley Skyhawk Wrestling Team. He attended Lock Haven University where he joined the Pi Kappa Alpha fraternity and spent his time at that school training both as a wrestler and a boxer, where he was NCBA (National Collegiate Boxing Association) Champion for the nationally recognized Lock Haven University boxing team. Also attended PCC (Pima Community College) outside of Maricopa county in Arizona.

Varner was instrumental in the legalization and forthcoming athletic sanctioning of mixed martial arts in the state of Arizona after giving testimony to the sport's legitimacy and ongoing development as an athletic profession.

After retiring from MMA in 2014, Varner continued his studies that were interrupted when Varner got into the UFC. Eventually Varner graduated with major from marketing and a minor in financing. After graduating he worked at Boston Scientific before transitioning to the stem cell domain.

Championships and accomplishments
Ultimate Fighting Championship
Fight of the Night (Three times)
World Extreme Cagefighting
WEC Lightweight Championship (One time)
Two successful title defenses 
Fight of the Night (Two Times)
Sherdog Awards
2012 Upset of the Year 
World MMA Awards
2012 Fight of the Year vs. Joe Lauzon at UFC on Fox: Shogun vs. Vera

Mixed martial arts record

|-
| Loss
| align=center|  (2)
| Drew Dober
| Submission (rear-naked choke)
| UFC on Fox: dos Santos vs. Miocic
| 
| align=center| 1
| align=center| 1:52
| Phoenix, Arizona, United States
| 
|-
| Loss
| align=center| 21–10–1 (2)
| James Krause
| TKO (ankle injury)
| UFC 173
| 
| align=center| 1
| align=center| 5:00
| Las Vegas, Nevada, United States
| 
|-
| Loss
| align=center| 21–9–1 (2)
| Abel Trujillo
| KO (punch)
| UFC 169
| 
| align=center| 2
| align=center| 2:32
| Newark, New Jersey, United States
| 
|-
| Loss
| align=center| 21–8–1 (2)
| Gleison Tibau
| Decision (split)
| UFC 164
| 
| align=center| 3
| align=center| 5:00
| Milwaukee, Wisconsin, United States
| 
|-
| Win
| align=center| 21–7–1 (2)
| Melvin Guillard
| Decision (split)
| UFC 155
| 
| align=center| 3
| align=center| 5:00
| Las Vegas, Nevada, United States
| 
|-
| Loss
| align=center| 20–7–1 (2)
| Joe Lauzon
| Submission (triangle choke)
| UFC on Fox: Shogun vs. Vera
| 
| align=center| 3
| align=center| 2:44
| Los Angeles, California, United States
| 
|-
| Win
| align=center| 20–6–1 (2)
| Edson Barboza
| TKO (punches)
| UFC 146
| 
| align=center| 1
| align=center| 3:23
| Las Vegas, Nevada, United States
| 
|-
| Win
| align=center| 19–6–1 (2)
| Drew Fickett
| Submission (punches)
| XFC 16
| 
| align=center| 1
| align=center| 0:40
| Knoxville, Tennessee, United States
| 
|-
| Win
| align=center| 18–6–1 (2)
| Nate Jolly
| KO (punches)
| XFC 14 
| 
| align=center| 1
| align=center| 1:09
| Orlando, Florida, United States
| 
|-
| Loss
| align=center| 17–6–1 (2)
| Dakota Cochrane
| Decision (unanimous)
| Titan FC 20
| 
| align=center| 3
| align=center| 5:00
| Kansas City, Kansas, United States
| 
|-
| Win
| align=center| 17–5–1 (2)
| Tyler Combs
| Submission (north-south choke)
| XFO 39
| 
| align=center| 1
| align=center| 1:30
| Hoffman Estates, Illinois, United States
| 
|-
| Loss
| align=center| 16–5–1 (2)
| Shane Roller
| Submission (rear-naked choke)
| WEC 53
| 
| align=center| 1
| align=center| 3:55
| Glendale, Arizona, United States
| 
|-
| Loss
| align=center| 16–4–1 (2)
| Donald Cerrone
| Decision (unanimous)
| WEC 51
| 
| align=center| 3
| align=center| 5:00
| Broomfield, Colorado, United States
| 
|-
| Draw
| align=center| 16–3–1 (2)
| Kamal Shalorus
| Draw (split)
| WEC 49
| 
| align=center| 3
| align=center| 5:00
| Edmonton, Alberta, Canada
| 
|-
| Loss
| align=center| 16–3 (2)
| Benson Henderson
| Submission (guillotine choke)
| WEC 46
| 
| align=center| 3
| align=center| 2:41
| Sacramento, California, United States
| 
|-
| Win
| align=center| 16–2 (2)
| Donald Cerrone
| Technical Decision (split)
| WEC 38
| 
| align=center| 5
| align=center| 3:10
| San Diego, California, United States
| 
|-
| Win
| align=center| 15–2 (2)
| Marcus Hicks
| TKO (punches)
| WEC 35: Condit vs. Miura
| 
| align=center| 1
| align=center| 2:08
| Las Vegas, Nevada, United States
| 
|-
| Win
| align=center| 14–2 (2)
| Rob McCullough
| TKO (punches)
| WEC 32: Condit vs. Prater
| 
| align=center| 3
| align=center| 2:54
| Rio Rancho, New Mexico, United States
| 
|-
| Win
| align=center| 13–2 (2)
| Sherron Leggett
| TKO (punches and elbows)
| WEC 29
| 
| align=center| 1
| align=center| 4:08
| Las Vegas, Nevada, United States
| 
|-
| Win
| align=center| 12–2 (2)
| Jason Gilliam
| Technical Submission (rear-naked choke)
| UFC 68
| 
| align=center| 1
| align=center| 1:34
| Columbus, Ohio, United States
| 
|-
| Loss
| align=center| 11–2 (2)
| Hermes França
| Submission (armbar)
| UFC 62: Liddell vs. Sobral
| 
| align=center| 3
| align=center| 3:31
| Las Vegas, Nevada, United States
| 
|-
| Win
| align=center| 11–1 (2)
| Leonard Wilson
| Submission (rear-naked choke)
| Rage in the Cage 78
| 
| align=center| 2
| align=center| 1:07
| Glendale, Arizona, United States
| 
|-
| NC
| align=center| 10–1 (2)
| Tony Llamas
| No Contest
| KOTC 56: Caliente
| 
| align=center| N/A
| align=center| N/A
| Globe, Arizona, United States
| 
|-
| Win
| align=center| 10–1 (1)
| Paul Arroyo
| Submission (punches)
| Rage in the Cage 71
| 
| align=center| 1
| align=center| 2:03
| Tempe, Arizona, United States
| 
|-
| Win
| align=center| 9–1 (1)
| Adam Roland
| TKO (punches)
| Rage in the Cage 70
| 
| align=center| 1
| align=center| 2:46
| Glendale, Arizona, United States
| 
|-
| Win
| align=center| 8–1 (1)
| Jesse Bongfeldt
| TKO (punches)
| WFF 7: Professional Shooto
| 
| align=center| 1
| align=center| 4:12
| Vancouver, British Columbia, Canada
| 
|-
| Win
| align=center| 7–1 (1)
| Kyle Bradley
| Submission (rear-naked choke)
| Fight Factory
| 
| align=center| 2
| align=center| 2:34
| N/A
| 
|-
| Win
| align=center| 6–1 (1)
| Kyle Sprouse
| Submission (choke)
| RITC 63: It's Time
| 
| align=center| 1
| align=center| 1:47
| Phoenix, Arizona, United States
| 
|-
| Win
| align=center| 5–1 (1)
| Garett Davis
| Submission (triangle choke)
| World Freestyle Fighting 6
| 
| align=center| 1
| align=center| 3:52
| Vancouver, British Columbia, Canada
| 
|-
| NC
| align=center| 4–1 (1)
| James Upshur
| No Contest
| RITC 61: Relentless
| 
| align=center| 2
| align=center| N/A
| Phoenix, Arizona, United States
| 
|-
| Win
| align=center| 4–1
| Jarvis Brennaman
| Submission (triangle choke)
| ECS: Evolution
| 
| align=center| 1
| align=center| 1:22
| Phoenix, Arizona, United States
| 
|-
| Win
| align=center| 3–1
| Dave Klein
| Submission (choke)
| RITC 50: The Prelude
| 
| align=center| 3
| align=center| 1:56
| Tucson, Arizona, United States
| 
|-
| Win
| align=center| 2–1
| Justin Nauling
| Submission (armbar)
| RITC 49: Stare Down
| 
| align=center| 2
| align=center| 0:38
| Phoenix, Arizona, United States
| 
|-
| Loss
| align=center| 1–1
| Jesse Moreng
| Decision (unanimous)
| RITC 47: Unstoppable
| 
| align=center| 3
| align=center| 3:00
| Phoenix, Arizona, United States
| 
|-
| Win
| align=center| 1–0
| Carlos Ortega
| Decision (unanimous)
| RITC 46: Launching Pad
| 
| align=center| 3
| align=center| 3:00
| Tempe, Arizona, United States
|

References

External links
 Official UFC Profile

http://webarchive.nationalarchives.gov.uk/20120804112126/http%3A//www.jamievarner.com/ Official Site

1984 births
Living people
Sportspeople from Glendale, Arizona
Mixed martial artists from Arizona
American male mixed martial artists
Lightweight mixed martial artists
Mixed martial artists utilizing collegiate wrestling
Mixed martial artists utilizing Brazilian jiu-jitsu
World Extreme Cagefighting champions
Ultimate Fighting Championship male fighters
American male sport wrestlers
Amateur wrestlers
American practitioners of Brazilian jiu-jitsu